Arctia hannyngtoni is a moth in the family Erebidae. It was described by George Hampson in 1910. It is found in the north-western Himalayas and Nepal.

The species of the genus Preparctia, including this one, were moved to Arctia as a result of phylogenetic research published by Rönkä et al. in 2016.

References

Moths described in 1910
Arctiini